Jabriyah was an early Islamic philosophical school  based on the belief that humans are controlled by predestination, without having choice or free will. The Jabriyah school originated during the Umayyad dynasty in Basra. The first representative of this school was Al-Ja'd ibn Dirham (executed in 724).

The term is derived from the Arabic root j-b-r, in the sense which gives the meaning of someone who is forced or coerced by destiny.

Jabriyah is a derogatory term used by different Islamic groups that they consider wrong, so it is not a specific theological school.

The Ash'ariyah used the term Jabriyah in the first place to describe the followers of Jahm ibn Safwan (died 746) in that they regarded their faith as a middle position between Qadariyah and Jabriya. On the other hand, the Mu'tazilah considered Ash'ariyah as Jabriyah because, in their opinion, they rejected the orthodox doctrine of free will, despite the Asharis rejecting this claim.

The Shiites used the term Jabriyah to describe Ash'ariyah and Hanbalis.

See also
 Qadariyah

References 

Islamic philosophical schools